"Gekidou/Just Break the Limit!" (激動/Just Break the Limit!) is the tenth single by Japanese band Uverworld and was released on 11 June 2008 in CD and CD+DVD format. This is the band's first double-A single. "Gekidou" was used as the fourth opening theme for the anime D.Gray-man and "Just break the limit!" was used in a commercial for Pocari Sweat.

Track listing

CD 
 
 "Just Break the Limit!"
 "Core Ability +81"

DVD 
 Talking About "U": Gekidō kara hajimaru Uverworld Dai 4 seiki e no intabyū
 Gekidou TV spot (type1, type2)

Personnel 
 TAKUYA∞ - vocals, rap, programming
 Katsuya - guitar, programming
 Akira - guitar, programming
 Nobuto - bass guitar
 Shintarou - drums

References

2008 singles
2008 songs
Uverworld songs
Anime songs
Gr8! Records singles